Vehicle 19 is a 2013 American action thriller film written and directed by Mukunda Michael Dewil. The film stars Paul Walker as a parole breaker who finds himself hunted by the police in Johannesburg after he picks up a rental car containing a phone, a gun and a kidnapped prosecutor. He races against time to dodge the police, expose their corruption and eventually reunite with his estranged wife.

Vehicle 19 was released on February 7, 2013, in South Africa and on June 14, 2013, in the United States.

Plot
Michael Woods is an American parolee who arrives in Johannesburg, after being released from prison, to meet up his wife Angie who works in the U.S. embassy.

Michael orders a rental car at the airport but is lost while on his way to the embassy. During his trip, Michael comes across a cellphone and a suppressed pistol inside. Afterwards, a police detective calls Michael who advises him to hand in the vehicle in exchange for a replacement.

Michael agrees to deliver the car only to find a gagged woman inside. Both Michael and the woman are soon attacked upon reaching the rendezvous point, causing Michael to drive away from the firefight. After several escape attempts, the woman reveals herself to be Rachel Shabangu, a prosecutor who gathered evidence against a criminal named Rhodes, due to which the latter kidnapped her. Furthermore, the police, including the detective, are on Rhodes' payroll. Michael and Rachel try to get help from her friends to no avail.

Helpless, Michael decides to drive to the courthouse with Rachel before realizing Angie might become involved. He succeeds in making sure Angie stays inside the embassy but Rachel is shot in the process. Before dying, she records her testimony using Michael's phone and entrusts him to expose Rhodes and the corrupt police department.

Saddened by Rachel's death, Michael leaves her body behind and is contacted by the detective who reveals he has framed Michael for Rachel's murder. Michael successfully dodges the police and gets his car sprayed to avoid being recognized. Following Rachel's earlier suggestion, he contacts a court judge who agrees to help Michael but also warns him to avoid going to the court as the police  are already there and waiting. When the phone runs out of battery, Michael uses the car adapter to recharge it.

Michael successfully makes it to the courthouse as more police arrive, resulting in a hostage situation as Michael holds a news reporter at gunpoint. However, the detective shows up and, trying to defuse the situation, shoots Michael at point blank. As the detective argues with his other police officers for injuring Michael, Rachel's testimony is seen playing over the reporter's microphone. With Rhodes' criminal activity exposed, he, the detective, and the rest of the corrupt officers are arrested. As the film ends, the titular vehicle is seen in the parking lot while news reports praise Michael for his heroism and bravery. It is implied that he had reunited with Angie while in critical care.

Cast
 Paul Walker as Michael Woods 
 Naima McLean as Rachel Shabangu 
 Gys de Villiers as Det. Smith
 Leyla Haidarian as Angelica Moore
 Tshepo Maseko as Lieutenant
 Andrian Mazive as Benji
 Welile Nzuza as Mohawk
 Mangaliso Ngema as James Muzuka
 Ernest Kubayi as Mr. Crackhead
 Elize Van Niekerk as Car Rental Receptionist

Distribution

Home media
In the United States, Vehicle 19 was released on DVD and Blu-ray on July 23, 2013. The film's original theatrical aspect ratio was 2.40:1, but the DVD and Blu-ray have cropped transfers framed at 1.78:1. The making-of featurette on the Blu-ray includes film clips in the original 2.40.1 aspect ratio. U.K. Blu-ray is in the original aspect ratio.

Reception

Box office
Vehicle 19 has grossed for a worldwide total of $2,145,231.

Critical response
Vehicle 19 has a 23% approval rating on Rotten Tomatoes, based on 26 reviews.

See also
 Beckett

External links
 
 
 
 
 

2013 films
2013 thriller films
American chase films
American action thriller films
Films about automobiles
Films set in South Africa
Films shot in South Africa
2010s English-language films
2010s American films